Pachyphoca is an extinct genus of earless seals from Neogene marine deposits in the northern part of the Paratethys basin.

Description
There are two recognized species of Pachyphoca, P. ukrainica and P. chapskii, both of which have been found in Serravallian-Tortonian-aged marine deposits in Ukraine. Pachyphoca ukrainica was the smaller of the two species, and shows more adaptations for terrestrial locomotion compared to the larger P chapskii.

References

Miocene pinnipeds
Phocines
Prehistoric carnivoran genera
Prehistoric pinnipeds of Europe
Fossil taxa described in 2013